Gunton may refer to:

Places
Gunton, Manitoba, Canada
Gunton, Norfolk, England
St Andrew's Church, Gunton, a redundant church near Gunton Hall, Norfolk
Gunton railway station in Thorpe Market, Norfolk
Gunton, Suffolk, England
Gunton Hall, Norfolk

Other uses
Gunton (surname)